The 1915 Oregon Webfoots football team represented the University of Oregon in the 1915 college football season.

The game against USC in Los Angeles was delayed two days due to rain and played on Monday. Oregon did not play border rival Washington this season.

Schedule

References

Oregon
Oregon Ducks football seasons
Oregon Webfoots football